Fatima Ahlem Mokhtari (born 14 June 1999) is an Algerian artistic gymnast. She represented Algeria at the 2014 Summer Youth Olympics and the 2019 African Games.

Competitive history 
Fatima placed 12th in the all-around at the 2014 African Junior Championships in Pretoria, South Africa and represented Algeria at the 2014 Summer Youth Olympics in Nanjing, China.

In 2019, she competed at the African Games where she won a silver medal in the team all-around event.

References

External links 
 
 

Algerian female artistic gymnasts
Gymnasts at the 2014 Summer Youth Olympics
1999 births
Living people
People from Tiaret
Competitors at the 2019 African Games
African Games silver medalists for Algeria
African Games medalists in gymnastics
21st-century Algerian women